is the third studio album by Chara, which was released on September 9, 1993. It debuted at #4 on the Japanese Oricon album charts, and charted in the top 200 for 8 weeks. It eventually sold 123,000 copies.

After the comparative success of her last album, Soul Kiss, Chara rose in popularity. Her first single from the album, was used in a Shiseido 'PJ Lapis' commercial campaign. It reached #66 on the singles chart: her first solo charting single.

, her next single, was her first double A-side single. Both songs featured commercial tie-ups (Marui Gift Campaign CMs and Snow Brand "Icecream Vintage" CMs respectively). "Charlotte no Okurimono" literally means Charlotte's Present, however this was the Japanese localisation's title of the famous 1952 children's book Charlotte's Web.

Two more singles were released from the album:  and Gifted Child. Despite Koi o Shita being released on the same day as the album and featuring no new songs, it managed to reach #87. However, Gifted Child, released approximately three months after the album's release, did not chart at all.

The album was recorded in France, and the pictures in the album's booklet/the album cover were shot in Paris.

Track listing

Singles

Japan Sales Rankings

References
 	

Chara (singer) albums
1993 albums
Sony Music Entertainment Japan albums